Miranda Nild (born 1 April 1997), known in Thailand as Suchawadee Nildhamrong, is an American-born Thai former professional footballer who played as a forward for the Thailand women's national team.

Early life 
Nild is the daughter of Selma and Jerry Nild and sister to her brother Wesley. She attended Castro Valley High School in Castro Valley, California. There, she played soccer under head coach Paul McCallion and was a member of the Varsity golf team during her freshman and sophomore years. In 2013, Nild led her team with 31 goals and 9 assists, helping her receive an All-East Bay First Team selection. In 2014, she led her team with 38 goals, helping her receive another All-East Bay First Team selection and First Team All-WACC Foothill Division selection. Nild also played club soccer under Patrick Uriz with Mustang Soccer and was a member of the 2010 State ODP team.

College career
Nild joined the California Golden Bears in 2015, majoring in American Studies. As a freshman, she made 18 appearances out of a total of 22 contests. She made the first two starts of her career in back-to-back road games versus California Polytechnic State University and versus the University of Colorado Boulder. Nild scored her first collegiate goal in a 2–0 victory against San Francisco on 18 September 2015. During her sophomore year, Nild played in all 21 matches, starting all but 2. She scored twice in the season in the span of 4 games, starting with a goal at Texas Tech University and ending with another versus The University of California, Davis. She was named as a Pac-12 All-Academic honorable mention. As a junior, she made a total of 17 appearances, making 14 starts. Nild led the team with seven goals, including three game-winners, and one assist, for a total of 15 points. She scored in 4 consecutive games dating from 27 August to 15 September, making it the longest goal-scoring streak by any Golden Bear since the 2014 season. Nild recorded her first collegiate assist on Abi Kim's equalizer in the 80th minute versus Santa Clara University. She scored the Golden Bears' only goal in the NCAA Tournament versus Santa Clara University. Nild was voted the team's Offensive MVP for the season. As a senior, she made 17 appearances, starting all but 1. Nild recorded 3 goals and 3 assists.

Club career
Nild signed with Gintra Universitetas in July 2019.

International career
Nild has a Thai father and an American mother. In April 2017, she received her first senior call-up for Thailand. On 3 April, she scored on her debut in a 6–0 victory against Palestine. In March 2018, she was named in the squad for the 2018 AFC Women's Asian Cup. She scored twice in a 6–1 win over Jordan on 9 April and played a role in all three goals against the Philippines on 12 April. Thailand, with one defeat and two wins, finished second in the group and qualified for the 2019 FIFA Women's World Cup. In June 2018, she was named in the squad for the 2018 AFF Women's Championship. On 4 July, she made her first appearance in the tournament, scoring four goals in an 11–0 victory against Cambodia. She finished the tournament with six goals in 5 appearances, helping Thailand claim their third AFF title in a row. In August 2018, she was named in the squad for the 2018 Asian Games. She made two appearances in the tournament, scoring a goal in a 3–2 loss to Vietnam. In February 2019, she was named in the squad for the 2019 Cyprus Women's Cup. She finished the tournament with one goal in four appearances.

International goals
Results list Thailand's goal tally first.

Honors

International
AFF Women's Championship: 2018

References

External links
 
 Miranda Nild at FA Thailand
 

1997 births
Living people
Sportspeople from Alameda, California
Sportspeople from Castro Valley, California
Soccer players from California
Miranda Nild
Thai expatriate footballers
Thai expatriate sportspeople in Lithuania
Thai expatriate sportspeople in Sweden
Miranda Nild
Miranda Nild
American women's soccer players
American expatriate sportspeople in Iceland
American expatriate sportspeople in Lithuania
American expatriate sportspeople in Sweden
American expatriate women's soccer players
American sportspeople of Thai descent
2019 FIFA Women's World Cup players
Miranda Nild
California Golden Bears women's soccer players
Competitors at the 2019 Southeast Asian Games
Expatriate women's footballers in Iceland
Expatriate women's footballers in Lithuania
Expatriate women's footballers in Sweden
Footballers at the 2018 Asian Games
Gintra Universitetas players
Kristianstads DFF players
National Women's Soccer League players
OL Reign players
Selfoss women's football players
Miranda Nild
Southeast Asian Games medalists in football
Women's association football forwards